Neil Walker (born 1985) is an American baseball player.

Neil Walker may also refer to:
 Neil Walker (lawyer) (born 1960), Scottish lawyer
 Neil Walker (swimmer) (born 1976), American  swimmer

See also
 Niel Walker (1895–1960), British army officer and cricketer